William Hearst may refer to:
William Randolph Hearst (1863–1951), American newspaper magnate and New York Congressman
William Randolph Hearst, Jr. (1908–1993), William Randolph Hearst's son
William Randolph Hearst III (born 1949), William Randolph Hearst, Jr.'s son, and grandson of the newspaper magnate
William Randolph Hearst II (born 1942), John Randolph Hearst's son, and grandson of the newspaper magnate
William Howard Hearst (1864–1941), Premier of Ontario, Canada, 1914–1919

See also
William Hurst (disambiguation)